Hasan Esat Işık (1916 – July 2, 1989) was a Turkish diplomat and politician.

Biography
Hasan Esat Işık was born in Istanbul. His father was Mehmet Esat, a well known physician. After graduating from Galatasaray High School and Ankara University Faculty of Law, he held various positions in Ministry of Foreign Affairs. He served as the Permanent Representative of the European Office in Geneva in 1952, and as Ambassador to Brussels, Moscow and Paris from 1962 to 1973. In 1965, he was appointed as the Minister of Foreign Affairs in the 29th cabinet of Turkey (AP-CKMP-YTP-MP) of Prime Minister Suat Hayri Ürgüplü. He was chosen outside the Turkish Grand National Assembly.

After leaving the Ministry of Foreign Affairs, he was elected as a Member of Parliament for Bursa from CHP in the 1973 and 1977 elections. He was appointed as Minister of National Defense in the 37th, 40th and 42nd cabinet of Turkey. He left the ministry on January 16, 1979.

Hasan Esat Işık was also the Deputy Secretary General of the CHP. He was among those who were banned from politics for 5 years by the new constitution following the 1980 coup d'etat.

Işık died in Ankara on July 2, 1989.

References

External links

 
|-

 
|-

 
|-

 

1916 births
1989 deaths
Politicians from Istanbul
Ministers of Foreign Affairs of Turkey
Republican People's Party (Turkey) politicians
Members of the 29th government of Turkey
Members of the 37th government of Turkey
Members of the 40th government of Turkey
Members of the 42nd government of Turkey
Galatasaray High School alumni
Ankara University Faculty of Law alumni
Ambassadors of Turkey to Belgium
Ambassadors of Turkey to France
Ambassadors of Turkey to Russia
Recipients of the Order of Merit of the Federal Republic of Germany